Stephanie Wroth Jamison (born July 17, 1948) is an American linguist, currently at University of California, Los Angeles and an Elected Fellow of the American Academy of Arts & Sciences. She did her doctoral work at Yale University as a student of Stanley Insler, and is trained as a historical linguist and Indo-Europeanist. Much of her work focusses on Sanskrit and other Indo-Iranian languages.

Selected works

References

1948 births
Living people
University of California, Los Angeles faculty
Linguists from the United States
Yale University alumni
Women linguists
Sanskrit scholars